Eucalyptus impensa, commonly known as the Eneabba mallee, is a species of straggly mallee that is endemic to a small area of Western Australia. It has smooth bark, dull, light green, egg-shaped to broadly lance-shaped leaves, flower buds arranged singly in leaf axils, pink flowers and relatively large, flattened hemispherical fruit.

Description
It has smooth grey and brownish bark. Flowering has been recorded in May, June and July and the flowers are pink.

Taxonomy and naming
Eucalyptus impensa was first formally described in 1993 by Ian Brooker and Stephen Hopper from a specimen collected from near Warradarge in 1987. The description was published in the journal Nuytsia. The specific epithet is from the Latin impensus, meaning 'ample', 'great', 'large' or 'strong', referring to the leaves and fruit of this species.

Distribution and habitat
The Eneabba mallee is restricted to six populations that occur over a range of about  near Eneabba. It grows in open shrub mallee over low heath on undulating plains and breakaways.

Conservation status
This mallee is listed as "Endangered" under the Australian Government Environment Protection and Biodiversity Conservation Act 1999 and as "Threatened Flora (Declared Rare Flora — Extant)" by the Department of Environment and Conservation (Western Australia). An "interim recovery plan" has been prepared.

In 2009, eight populations of this mallee were known and counts suggested that the total number of mature plants was about 114. The main threats to the species are insect damage, inappropriate fire regimes, firebreak maintenance and disease. The species as a whole is threatened by its narrow range and lack of recruitment.

See also
List of Eucalyptus species

References

Eucalypts of Western Australia
impensa
Myrtales of Australia
Plants described in 1993
Taxa named by Stephen Hopper
Taxa named by Ian Brooker